"Walk the Straight and Narrow" is the 36th episode in the Batman television series' second season, originally airing on ABC September 8, 1966 (the same evening which saw the debut of Star Trek on NBC) and repeated on June 1, 1967.

Plot synopsis

From the last episode, just as the Dynamic Duo are about to be impaled they activate Bat-springs hidden in their boots, which catapult them out of harm's way. Rather than go back after the superheroes, the Archer (Art Carney) and his "merry malefactors" opt to beat a hasty retreat to their new hideout in the basement of police headquarters. Next, the archer and his men hijack an armoured car carrying $10 million, which the Wayne Foundation plans to donate to the destitute Gothamites. The truck is later found abandoned a short distance away with the cash left untouched, so the ceremony commences as planned. Whilst Alfred Pennyworth (Alan Napier), in disguise as Batman, and Robin bear witness from across the street, Bruce Wayne attends the ceremony, where it's learned that the Archer has substituted the money in the truck for counterfeit currency bearing the Archer's picture. Batman deduces that Alan A. Dale, one of the Wayne Foundation's directors who was responsible for the money's well-being, is one of the Archer's malefactors, and they are planning to escape by boat to Switzerland in the international waters of the Atlantic Ocean, where they assume they'll be forever protected from the law. The Dynamic Duo chase the villains by Batboat and rout the Archer, Crier Tuck (Doodles Weaver), Big John (Loren Ewing), Maid Marilyn (Barbara Nichols), and Alan A. Dale (Robert Cornthwaite) before they get the chance. Maid Marilyn gives Batman & Robin swords with which to defend themselves. Later, Bruce, Dick and Alfred perform archery on their front lawn. Alfred offers to shoot an apple off Dick Grayson's head. Instead they place the apple on a target, which Alfred misses.

External links

1966 American television episodes
Batman (TV series) episodes